Theodore Apsevdis was a Greek painter assumed to be from Constantinople. He is one of the few Byzantine painters known by name.  His contemporary in Italy was Alberto Sotio; both painters were active during the same period. They were active during the Komnenian restoration. Apsevdis's work influenced the Palaeologan Renaissance. Several Italian artists who painted in the style were Coppo di Marcovaldo and Guido of Siena.   Apsevdis and his contemporaries set the stage for the Italian and Cretan Renaissance.  Some of his notable work is in Cyprus.

History
He may have been born in Constantinople sometime during the 12th century.  Not much is known about his life.  His painting style resembles the art of Constantinople.  Historians have deduced he was from the city.  He may have traveled all over the empire painting in different churches.  His signature was found in one of the churches he painted in Cyprus.  He is one of the few artists of the period whose name is known. Italian painter  Alberto Sotio was the other known artist of the Italio-Byzantium during the same period.  Many of Apsevdis's paintings survive until today.  They are over 852 years old and are primarily in Cyprus. His main work is at the Hermitage of Saint Neophytos, Cyprus. The 1192 murals of Panagia tou Araka have also been ascribed to him.

Gallery
Known to be by Apsevdis:

Ascribed to Apsevdis:

See also
Manuel Panselinos
Ioannis Kornaros

References

Byzantine Cyprus
1150 births
1215 deaths
Byzantine painters
Christian iconography
12th-century births
13th-century deaths
13th-century Byzantine people
12th-century Byzantine people
13th-century Greek people
12th-century Greek people
13th-century Greek painters
12th-century Greek painters
Deaths in Cyprus
People from Constantinople
Greek Cypriot artists
Constantinopolitan Greeks